"Cathedral Song" is a song by English singer-songwriter Tanita Tikaram, released as a single from her debut album, Ancient Heart (1988). It peaked at #48 in the UK. An extended length music video was made from the song, portraying a love story between two swimmers in a Summer setting. The video was shot in black and white, and Tikaram appears only in studio footage, not on the external footage. Most of the music video was filmed in Portugal, in Praia Grande, Praia do Guincho, Estoril and Cristo Rei sanctuary.

Releases
WEA released a limited edition 7-inch EP box set which had three prints from the video.  Other formats also had live tracks - "Over You All" (CD/7-inch box), "Let's Make Everybody Smile Today" (CD/12-inch/7-inch box) and "Fireflies In The Kitchen" (12-inch). Studio versions of the latter two were not recorded.

Reception
Upon release, William Shaw of Smash Hits wrote: "It's a pleasant enough tune; a dreamy, floaty thing, full of haunting organs and guitar pluckings. But, if like me you spend all your time wondering what Tanita is singing about, then the sepulchral beauty of the whole thing kind of passes you by."

Charts

Covers
The song was covered by Brazilian singer Zélia Duncan. Her version, which has a similar arrangement but lyrics in Portuguese, was released in her second homonymous album (1994) and became a smash hit in Brazil and "Catedral" (the Brazilian title of the song) is still considered a classic tune. The translated version has also been covered by Leandro, from the duo Leandro e Leonardo.  The song was also covered by Renato Russo from the Legião Urbana band.

References

1989 singles
Tanita Tikaram songs
Songs written by Tanita Tikaram
1988 songs
Warner Music Group singles
Song recordings produced by Rod Argent